Fifty Eggs is musician Dan Bern's second studio album, and follow up to his self-titled debut.  It was produced by Ani DiFranco and released in 1998.

Track listing
All tracks composed by Dan Bern
"Tiger Woods"
"One Thing Real"
"No Missing Link"
"Oh Sister"
"Cure for AIDS"
"Chick Singers"
"Different Worlds"
"Everybody's Baby"
"One Dance"
"Jesus Freak"
"Monica"
"Rolling Away"
"Suzanne" (hidden track)

References

1998 albums
Dan Bern albums
Work Records albums